John Walsh is a filmmaker and author. He is the founder of the film company Walsh Bros. Ltd. His film work on subjects such as social mobility and social justice has received two BAFTA nominations.

Early life and education
A filmmaker from a young age, Walsh had his first super-8 camera by the age of ten. At the age of 18 he was the youngest student accepted to the London Film School (LFS) in 1989. He made a film there on stop-motion animation filmmaker Ray Harryhausen. Walsh graduated from the LFS in 1990 or 1991, according to its blog. Walsh is a Trustee of the Ray and Diana Harryhausen Foundation.

Film 
In 2010, Walsh stood as a Parliamentary candidate in the 2010 General Election and made the gonzo-style documentary feature film Tory Boy The Movie which was released in cinemas in 2011 and 2012. The film follows Walsh as he becomes a Conservative candidate after a lifetime of voting Labour. In the film, he claims that Sir Stuart Bell, the Labour Party's MP in Middlesbrough, is absent so often from Middlesbrough that he is an unsuitable candidate. According to Richard Moss, the political editor for BBC North East & Cumbria, "some silliness aside, it is a thought-provoking insight into the way our political system works or doesn't work on the ground." It was subsequently nominated for the Grierson Awards for "Best Documentary on a Contemporary Theme". The film received a re-release in cinemas in 2015 in the lead-up to the 2015 UK General Election. The student union at Teesside University cancelled a screening of it in 2015.

In 2014 Walsh's remastered version of the film Monarch was released. The original negative for the film had been lost. The film starred late Irish stage and screen actor T. P. McKenna and Jean Marsh. This subsequently led to cinema showing starting at the Tricycle Cinema.

Television 
In 2010, Walsh's five part BBC series on childhood homeless Sofa Surfers was nominated for the Social Award at the Rose d'Or Awards.

The BAFTA-nominated 2010 film My Life: Karate Kids tackled issues of bullying among disabled children. It was narrated by David Tennant. 

The Monte Carlo Golden Nymph Award nominated  BBC film Toy Soldiers, made in 2010 and screened in 2014, presented the point of view of the bereaved children of UK service personnel. Walsh discussed this on the BBC Radio 4 Today Programme. According to the blog of the private medidcal service Dr Mortons, the film was mentioned positively by retired psychiatrist Geraldine Walford, who said it had been shown in schools across the country. It was also entered for the Foundation Prix Jeunesse in 2012.

Walsh's three-part Grierson Trust-nominated BBC series Headhunting The Homeless was part of the BBC's 120 most treasured programmes of the first half of 2003 in the corporation's drive to convince its critics that the licence fee should not be abolished. The Guardian described the series as "truly touching" and also chose it as their Pick of the Day.

Walsh worked with charity boss Eva Hamilton again on her subsequent venture Key4Life and made a five-minute publicity film for them in December 2013 about their work with former young offenders.

The BAFTA-nominated and New York Film Festival-winning Channel 4 series Don't Make Me Angry was about anger management. This ran for two series.

Walsh Bros Ltd.
Walsh founded his company in 1992. Walsh Bros Ltd. was ranked 70 in the Televisual Magazine list of the top 100 independent film companies in the UK in 2012.

Ray & Diana Harryhausen Foundation 
Walsh has been a Trustee of the Ray & Diana Harryhausen Foundation since 2014. He first met with Ray Harryhausen in the late 1980s as a film student of the London Film School and in 1990 wrote and directed a 15-minute documentary entitled Ray Harryhausen: Movement Into Life, narrated by Tom Baker.

Walsh filmed and recorded commentary tracks with Ray Harryhausen in his London home commencing 17 May 2012.  Since that date recordings were made for Clash of The Titans, Mysterious Island, The 3 Worlds of Gulliver, First Men in the Moon with Randy Cook, The Valley of Gwangi with his daughter Vanessa Harryhausen, One Million Years B.C. with Martine Beswick, The Golden Voyage of Sinbad with fellow Trustee Caroline Munro, Mighty Joe Young with film director John Landis and Sinbad and the Eye of the Tiger with SFX artist Colin Arthur. Walsh donated the film and sound footage to the Ray & Diana Harryhausen Foundation and they contain many new revelations by Ray on how his films were created and produced.

San Diego Comic-Con announced the new Ray Harryhausen Awards which were devised by Walsh  and revealed at their 2021 panel at Comic Con.

Writing and journalism

In additional to his film and TV screenplays, Walsh has written for various print and online publications on film history, politics and religion in The Daily Telegraph, The Independent, The Catholic Herald and Conservative Home. He contributed to the Titan Books title, Ray Harryhausen Poster Art Book, written by sci-fi journalist and author Richard Holliss.

His first book Harryhausen: The Lost Movies was published 10 September 2019 by Titan Books.

His second book, Flash Gordon: The Official Story of the Film, was published in November 2020 by Titan Books.

In 2021, Screen Rant announced the publication of Walsh’s next book, Escape From New York: The Official Story of the Film, which will be published on September 28 by Titan Books.

Books

Filmography and awards

References

External links
 Walsh Bros Ltd. official site
 
 Titan Books - Author Page
 

Living people
20th-century British people
British male writers
British mass media company founders
Alumni of the London Film School
BBC people
British documentary filmmakers
Film directors from London
English film producers
English male screenwriters
British television directors
English television producers
British film production company founders
British male television writers
Television show creators
People from Greenwich
Year of birth missing (living people)
Conservative Party (UK) parliamentary candidates
21st-century British screenwriters
21st-century English male writers